Shaina Fewell is an American writer and producer. In 2017, she became Writer Producer on Outlander season 4 for Starz and produced 13 episodes of the series. She also wrote episode 6 and co-wrote episode 11 of season 4. She was Supervising Producer on season 5 & season 6. Most recently, Shaina served as Co-Executive Producer and Writer on Fate: The Winx Saga. In 2016, Fewell was Writer Co-Producer on Guilt, which debuted June 13, 2016 on Freeform.

In 2012, Fewell wrote for Lifetime Network's hit TV series The Client List as Executive Story Editor where she penned the show's first musical episode.

Prior to this, she wrote for One Tree Hill at The CW for three seasons. Episodes written by Fewell include: The Killing Moon (2012); The Drinks We Drank Last Night (2011); and, Learning To Fall (2010).

Fewell's passion for music and travel inspired the television show Project MyWorld broadcast on The 101 Network (an exclusive service of DirecTV), which she co-created, executive produced and starred in, showcasing her global travels for two seasons as she discovered up and coming indie bands.

Fewell has developed several shows including: a super-heroine project with Stan Lee and a time travel project with Universal Studios and Parkes-MacDonald.

Fewell is currently developing a TV show for Insurrection Media based on a book called Mila 2.0 optioned from HarperCollins Publishers. Executive Producer David Alpert and Skybound Entertainment are attached.

References

External links
 

Year of birth missing (living people)
Living people
American television writers
American television producers
American women television producers
American women television writers
21st-century American women